Karma Tenzin (born 1 December 1972), is an archer who internationally represented Bhutan.

Tenzin competed for Bhutan at the 1992 Summer Olympics in Barcelona, he finished 71st in the individual event and the three man team finished 20th.

References

External links
 

1972 births
Living people
Olympic archers of Bhutan
Archers at the 1992 Summer Olympics
Bhutanese male archers
Place of birth missing (living people)

.